The 2013–14 Ohio Bobcats men's basketball team represented Ohio University during the 2013–14 NCAA Division I men's basketball season. The Bobcats, led by second year head coach Jim Christian, played their home games at the Convocation Center as members of the East Division of the Mid-American Conference. They finished the season 25–12, 11–7 in MAC play to finish in third place in the East Division. They advanced to the quarterfinals of the MAC tournament where they lost to Akron. They were invited to the CollegeInsider.com Tournament where they defeated Cleveland State and Wright State to advance to the quarterfinals where they lost to VMI. After the season Christian accepted the head coach position at Boston College.

Before the season

Departures

Recruits

Season
The Bobcats started the 2013-14 season strong. In non-conference play the team went 10-3 only losing to #10 Ohio State, #20 Massachusetts, and Oakland. Once Mid-American Conference (MAC) play began the streak continued, starting 6-2 in conference play. At the conclusion of the regular season, the Bobcats finished 21-10, 11-7 in the MAC, and clinched the 5th seed in the 2014 MAC men's basketball tournament. With 21 wins, it is the 4th time within 5 years the Bobcats have reached 20 or more wins in a season. Senior Nick Kellogg broke the school record for career 3 point shots made (previously held by D. J. Cooper) in his final regular season game against Miami {OH}. Kellogg later broke the MAC record for career 3 point shots made in the first round MAC tournament win over Ball State. Ohio lost to Akron in the quarterfinals of the 2014 MAC tournament.

Roster

Preseason
The preseason poll and league awards were announced by the league office on October 29, 2013.  Ohio was picked to finish third in the MAC East

Preseason men's basketball poll
(First place votes in parenthesis)

East Division
 Akron 143 (18)
 Buffalo 120 (6)
 Ohio 94
 Kent State 91 (1)
 Miami 42
 Bowling Green 35

West Division
 Toledo 149 (24)
 Western Michigan 108
 Eastern Michigan 101 (1)
 Ball State 89
 Central Michigan 50
 Northern Illinois 28

Tournament champs
Akron (14), Toledo (7), Buffalo (1)

Postseason

Ohio participated in the 2014 CollegeInsider.com Tournament (CIT) where they beat Cleveland State 64-62 in the first round, defeated Wright State 56-54 in the second round, then lost to VMI 90-92 in the quarterfinals. Senior Jon Smith abruptly quit the team before the first round of the CIT, creating some controversy. The 2013-14 seniors of the Bobcats are the all-time winningest class in the programs history.

Schedule and results
Source: 

|-
!colspan=9 style=| Exhibition

|-
!colspan=9 style=| Non-conference games

|-
!colspan=9 style=| MAC regular season

|-
!colspan=9 style=| MAC Tournament

|-
!colspan=9 style=| CIT

Player honors and awards

Academic All-MAC Honorable Mentions
 Treg Setty - Redshirt Sophomore - 3.212 GPA - Communication Studies
 Travis Wilkins - Senior - 3.570 GPA - Psychology

MAC All-Tournament Team
 Nick Kellogg - Senior - G

All-MAC Second Team
 Nick Kellogg - Senior - G
 Maurice Ndour - Junior - F

Statistics

Team Statistics
Final 2013–14 Statistics

Source

Player statistics

Source

Awards and honors

All-MAC Awards 

Source

References

Ohio
Ohio Bobcats men's basketball seasons
Ohio
Ohio Bobcats men's basketball team
Ohio Bobcats men's basketball team